Himala  is a genus of moths in the subfamily Lymantriinae. The genus was erected by Moore in 1879.

Species
Himala argentea Walker, 1855
Himala eshanensis C. L. Chao, 1983 - transferred from Ivela eshanensis since 2000
Himala nigripennis Kishida, 2000 - captured by Owada, 1995, 1997

References

Kishida, Yasunori (2000). "A new species of the genus Himala Moore, 1879 (Lepidoptera, Lymantriidae) from Vietnam". Lepidoptera Science. 51 (3): 231–232. 

Lymantriinae